Burton Leander Rowing Club is a rowing club on the River Trent, based at Stapenhill Road, Burton upon Trent, Staffordshire.

Club colours
The blade and kit colours are white, scarlet and black.

History
The club has open membership and runs teams for all age groups. The original Burton Rowing Club and Burton Leander Rowing Club merged in the early part of the 20th century. The boathouse sits next door to rival club Trent Rowing Club.

The club won the prestigious Wyfold Challenge Cup at the Henley Regatta in 1958. Many years later in 1993 they won the Fawley Challenge Cup as part of a composite team with the Walton Rowing Club.

Honours

Henley Royal Regatta

British champions

References

Sport in Staffordshire
Sport in Burton upon Trent
Rowing clubs in England
Rowing clubs of the River Trent
Burton upon Trent